is a Japanese swimmer, who specialized in breaststroke events. She claimed the 200 m breaststroke title in a close race against U.S. swimmer and eventual Olympic champion Rebecca Soni by 0.03 of a second at the 2005 Summer Universiade in Izmir, Turkey with a time of 2:27.81. Taneda is an economics graduate at Kanagawa University in Kanagawa.

Taneda competed for the Japanese team in a breaststroke double at the 2008 Summer Olympics in Beijing. Leading up to the Games, she emerged the only swimmer to meet the Olympic qualifying standard in the 100 m breaststroke with a 1:07.91, and then beat her rival Rie Kaneto to clear the FINA-A cut time in 2:24.54 for a 200 m breaststroke victory at the Olympic trials in Tokyo. On the second day of the Games, Taneda missed out the semifinals by 0.08 of a second, after finishing seventeenth in the preliminary heats of the 100 m breaststroke in 1:08.45. In her second event, 200 m breaststroke, Taneda rounded out the final in last place by nine hundredths of a second (0.09) behind her teammate Rie Kaneto in 2:25.23.

References

External links
NBC 2008 Olympics profile

1986 births
Living people
Olympic swimmers of Japan
Swimmers at the 2008 Summer Olympics
Japanese female breaststroke swimmers
Universiade medalists in swimming
Sportspeople from Sapporo
Universiade gold medalists for Japan
Medalists at the 2005 Summer Universiade